Raimund "Ray" Wersching (born August 21, 1950) is an Austrian former placekicker in the National Football League (NFL). He played in the NFL for a span of 15 years, from 1973 through 1987.

Early career
He attended Warren High School in Downey, California.

NFL career
Undrafted after his career at Cerritos College and the University of California, Berkeley, Wersching was signed by the San Diego Chargers, where he played for four years.  In 1977, Wersching joined the San Francisco 49ers.  In Super Bowl XVI, Wersching tied a Super Bowl record by kicking four field goals, and his field position kick-offs also helped his team win, 26–21.  He won another Super Bowl ring with the 49ers in Super Bowl XIX, defeating the Miami Dolphins 38–16.  When he retired, Wersching held 49ers records for points, field goals and extra points.  He was the 12th player in NFL history to score 1,000 points in a career, and is the most recent player to have scored from a fair catch kick.

Wersching had a unique kicking style. Upon crossing the out of bound line onto the field to kick a field goal or extra point, he always looked down, never raising his head until after he kicked.

Other
Wersching holds an inactive public accountant's license. He was a contestant on the original version of the game show High Rollers in 1975.

In 2006; Wersching along with business partner Mary Ann Locke were indicted on embezzlement charges of $8 million in insurance premiums. Wersching served six months in home confinement and was placed on probation for two years, the San Francisco Chronicle reported. When he pleaded guilty in December 2007 to failing to file a corporate tax return, federal prosecutors dropped charges that he had been involved in an $8 million embezzlement (while Locke served time in prison) but would lose his business as a result.

References

1950 births
Living people
Austrian players of American football
American football placekickers
California Golden Bears football players
San Diego Chargers players
San Francisco 49ers players
Sportspeople from Downey, California
People from Vöcklabruck District
Players of American football from California
Austrian emigrants to the United States
Cerritos Falcons football players
Sportspeople from Upper Austria